Maldives Football Awards is an association football award presented annually by MaldivesFootball.com, in association with the Football Association of Maldives, since 2016.

The first awarding ceremony was held on 29 December 2016 in Male', Maldives.

Winners

Maldives Football Awards Best Men's Player

Maldives Football Awards Best Foreign Men's Player

Maldives Football Awards Best Goalkeeper

Maldives Football Awards Best Men's Coach

Maldives Football Awards Best Supporters' Club

References

Association football trophies and awards
Football in the Maldives